Mahonia pinnata (syn. Berberis pinnata) is a species of shrub in the barberry family. Common names include California barberry, wavyleaf barberry, and shinyleaf mahonia. It is similar to the Oregon-grape  (Mahonia aquifolium), and is sometimes called the California Oregon-grape.

It is native to the west coast of North America from British Columbia to Baja California, where it occurs in forest, woodland, chaparral, and other habitat.

Description
Mahonia pinnata is a dark green bush which resembles holly with its serrated leaves. It has one to two inch long clusters of small yellow flowers.  The fruit is a sour but edible purple berry with many seeds.

Uses
The Mahonia pinnata fruits have also been used to produce purple dye. The shrub is used in landscaping as an ornamental plant. Songbirds eat the berries.

Conservation
One subspecies of this plant is very rare and is federally listed as an endangered species. It is known only from Santa Cruz Island, one of the Channel Islands of California, where it is known from 13 or fewer individuals.

Etymology
Mahonia is named for Bernard McMahon (1775-1816), an American horticulturist.

Pinnata means 'set in two opposite rows' or 'pinnate', and is a reference in this case to the arrangement of the leaflets.

References

External links
Jepson Manual Treatment - Mahonia pinnata
Mahonia pinnata - Photo gallery

pinnata
Flora of Baja California
Flora of British Columbia
Flora of the West Coast of the United States
Medicinal plants
Bird food plants
Garden plants of North America
Drought-tolerant plants
Flora without expected TNC conservation status